The following are a list of songs released by English rock band Embrace from 1997 to the present day. The dates given are the dates on which the songs were released. The highest ever chart position was reached by the single "Nature's Law" which was ranked 2nd. The albums This New Day, Out of Nothing and The Good Will Out all reached number 1 on the charts.

Singles

I Can't Come Down (2007)
Target (2006)
World at Your Feet (2006)
Nature's Law (2006)
A Glorious Day (2005)
Looking As You Are (2005)
Ashes (2004)
Gravity (2004)
Make It Last (2001)
Wonder (2001)
I Wouldn't Wanna Happen to You (2000)
Save Me (2000)
You're Not Alone (2000)
Hooligan (1999)
The Good Will Out (1998)
My Weakness Is None of Your Business (1998)
Come Back to What You Know (1998)
All You Good Good People (1997)
One Big Family (1997)
Fireworks (1997)

B-sides (released on albums)
B-sides from the album Dry Kids: B-Sides 1997–2005

The Shot's Still Ringing
Madelaine
Flaming Red Hair
How Come
Dry Kids
Butter Wouldn't Melt
Too Many Times
Blind
Maybe I Wish
Free Ride
Feels Like Glue
I've Been Running
Brothers And Sisters
Milk And Honey
The Way I Do
Love Is Back
Waterfall

B-sides (not released on albums)
Contender (2007)
Heart & Soul (2007)
Run Away (2006)
One Luck (2006)
Thank God You Were Mean To Me (2006)
Just Admit It (2006)
Love Order (2006)
Whatever It Takes (2006)
What Lies Behind Us (2006)
Deliver Me (2006)
Collide (2006)
Soulmates (2006)
Red Eye Shot (2005)
Hallelujah (2005)
The Final Say (2005)
I Ache (2005)
Soldiers Hours (2005)
Enough (2004)
Wasted (2004)
Fight Yer Corner (2001)
It's You I Make It For (2001)
Giving, Forgiving and Giving In (2001)
What You've Never Had You'll Never Have (2001)
Anywhere You Go (2001)
Today (2001)
Everyday (2001)
Caught In a Rush (2001)
The First Cut (2000)
I Know What's Going On (2000)
Top of the Heap (2000)
Get On Board (2000)
Still So Young (2000)
A Tap On Your Shoulder (2000)
Happy And Lost (2000)
Come On And Smile (2000)
Like A Believer (1999)
With The One Who Got Me Here (1999)
I Can't Feel Bad Anymore (1999)
Don't Turn Your Back On Love (1998)
Feelings I Thought You Shared (1998)
If You Feel Like A Sinner (1998)
Perfect Way (1998)
You've Only Gotta Stop To Get Better (1997)
You Don't Amount To Anything - This Time (1997)

Songs released only on albums 

This New Day
No Use Crying (2006)
Sainted (2006)
Celebrate (2006)
Exploding Machines (2006)
Even Smaller Stones (2006)
The End Is Near (2006)
This New Day (2006)
Out of Nothing
Someday (2004)
Wish 'Em All Away (2004)
Keeping (2004)
Spell It Out (2004)
Near Life (2004)
Out Of Nothing (2004)
If You've Never Been
Over (2001)
I Hope You're Happy Now (2001)
Many Will Learn (2001)
It's Gonna Take Time (2001)
Hey, What You Trying To Say (2001)
If You've Never Been In Love With Anything (2001)
Happiness Will Get You In The End (2001)
Satellites (2001)
Drawn from Memory
The Love It Takes (2000)
Drawn from Memory (2000)
Bunker Song (2000)
New Adam New Eve (2000)
Yeah You (2000)
Liars Tears (2000)
I Had A Time (2000)
The Good Will Out
Retread (1998)
Higher Sights (1998)
I Want The World (1998)
You've Gotta Say Yes (1998)
The Last Gas (1998)
That's All Changed Forever (1998)
Now You're Nobody (1998)

Cover songs
"Three Is A Magic Number" (released on the album of singles - Fireworks)
"How Come" originally by D12 (released on "Radio 1's Live Lounge)
"Chestnuts Roasting on an Open Fire" (can be found on a rare 1 song album titled 'The Christmas Song')

Other songs
Forever Young (performed live at RAH)

References

Embrace